Arpit Ranka is an Indian model and actor. He is best known for portraying Duryodhana in Mahabharat and Kans in RadhaKrishn.

Filmography

Films

Television

References

External links

Living people
Indian male models
Indian male film actors
Indian male television actors
Participants in Indian reality television series
1983 births